The 2011 Big South men's basketball tournament took place on March 1, 3, and 5, 2011, at campus sites. The semifinal round was televised on ESPNU, and the finals were televised on ESPN2. The UNC Asheville Bulldogs won the tournament, defeating Charleston Southern 72–63 in the quarterfinal round, High Point 62–45 in the semifinal round, and #1 Coastal Carolina 60–47 in the championship game.

Format
The top eight eligible men's basketball teams in the Big South Conference received a berth in the conference tournament.  After the 18 game conference season, teams were seeded by conference record.  The winner received an automatic bid to the NCAA tournament, and UNC Asheville received that bid in 2011 as they won the tournament.  Presbyterian was not eligible to compete in the 2011 tournament due to reclassification.

Bracket

 asterisk indicates overtime game

References

Tournament
Big South Conference men's basketball tournament
Big South Conference men's basketball tournament